Edward Thomas Williams (1901–1973) was a lieutenant general in the United States Army.  He gained prominence as chief of artillery for the Third United States Army in Europe during World War II, commander of the United States Army Field Artillery Center, and commander of the Fourth United States Army.

Early life

Williams was born in Detroit, Michigan, on February 6, 1901.  He graduated from the United States Military Academy at West Point in 1920.

Early career

In 1921 Williams graduated from the Field Artillery Basic Course.

Williams served in artillery assignments of increasing rank and responsibility throughout the 1920s and 1930s, including a posting to Schofield Barracks, Hawaii, as a member of the 13th Field Artillery Regiment, assignment to Aberdeen Proving Ground, Maryland, and a position as an instructor at Fort Sill, Oklahoma.

In 1939 Williams graduated from the Command and General Staff College.

World War II

Williams served as commander of the Third United States Army Artillery during World War II, taking part in operations throughout Europe after the D-Day invasion and earning the Distinguished Service Medal.

Post World War II

From 1950 to 1952 Williams was assigned as deputy chief of staff for operations at the U.S. Army European Command.

Williams served as chief of staff for U.S. Army, Europe from 1952 to 1953.

In 1953 Williams was appointed deputy commander of the Third United States Army, serving until 1954.

Williams was then named commander of the United States Army Field Artillery Center, serving from 1954 to 1956.

In 1956 Williams was named deputy commander of the Continental Army Command, a position he held until 1959.

In 1958 he chaired the Williams Board, which reviewed and recommended changes to the Army's professional education system for officers.

Williams was selected to command the Fourth United States Army in 1959, and he served in this post until his retirement.

While commanding the Fourth Army Williams represented the United States at the funeral of Walter Williams of Texas, who claimed to have been a Confederate soldier and the last living American Civil War veteran.

Retirement and awards

General Williams retired in 1961.  His awards and decorations included two Distinguished Service Medals, the Legion of Merit, and the Bronze Star.

Death and burial

Williams died on October 14, 1973, in San Antonio, Texas.  He was buried at Fort Sam Houston National Cemetery, Section PA, Site 249-C.

References

External links
Generals of World War II

1901 births
United States Army generals
United States Military Academy alumni
United States Army Command and General Staff College alumni
Recipients of the Distinguished Service Medal (US Army)
Recipients of the Legion of Merit
Military personnel from Detroit
Military personnel from San Antonio
1973 deaths
Burials at Fort Sam Houston National Cemetery
United States Army generals of World War II